Rudy Dekeyser was until May 2012 the Managing Director of VIB (the Flanders Institute for Biotechnology). He was until May 2012 head of the technology transfer team of the institute. He obtained a PhD in molecular biology at the University of Ghent.

He was director of DevGen and CropDesign and is a director of the biotech companies Ablynx, Peakadilly, Actogenix, EMBLEM (technology transfer company of EMBL) and FlandersBio. He is also co-founder of ASTP (Association or European Science and Technology Professionals) and visiting professor innovation and management at the University of Ghent.

References
 Caplan A, Dekeyser R, Van Montagu M, Selectable markers for rice transformation, Methods Enzymol. 1992;216:426–41.
 Claes B, Dekeyser R, Villarroel R, Van den Bulcke M, Bauw G, Van Montagu M, Caplan A, Characterization of a rice gene showing organ-specific expression in response to salt stress and drought, Plant Cell. 1990 Jan;2(1):19–27.
 Dekeyser R, Claes B, Marichal M, Van Montagu M, Caplan A, Evaluation of Selectable Markers for Rice Transformation, Plant Physiol. 1989 May;90(1):217–223.

Sources
 VIB

Flemish scientists
Belgian businesspeople
Ghent University alumni
Living people
Year of birth missing (living people)